Cullivel is a locality in the Riverina district of New South Wales, Australia. It was the site of a now-closed railway station between 1911 and 1975 on the Oaklands railway line. A wheat silo remains, and a State Forest bearing the same name lies to the north-west.

Cullivel railway station

References

Towns in the Riverina
Towns in New South Wales